Jessika is a 1905 Czech-language opera  by Josef Bohuslav Foerster to a libretto after Shakespeare's The Merchant of Venice and named after the character Jessica in that play.

References

1905 operas
Compositions by Josef Bohuslav Foerster
Czech-language operas
Operas